The 2019–20 season is Argentinos Juniors' 3rd consecutive season in the top division of Argentine football. In addition to the Primera División, the club are competing in the Copa Argentina, Copa de la Superliga and Copa Sudamericana.

The season generally covers the period from 1 July 2019 to 30 June 2020.

Review

Pre-season
Francisco González Metilli sealed his loan departure from Argentinos Juniors on 18 June 2019, as he penned terms with newly-promoted Primera B Nacional team Estudiantes (BA). They played Huracán in a friendly double-header on 26 June, losing the initial match 3–0 prior to winning the secondary encounter thanks to a goal from Iván Colman. Nahuel Rodríguez left on loan to Brown on 26 June, which preceded Gastón Bojanich going permanently to Barracas Central. Estudiantes (BA) were met in two pre-season matches on 29 June, with both encounters ending in 1–1 draws; Colman and youngster Lucas Ambrogio scored for them. Gastón Machín and Leonardo Pisculichi terminated their contracts in June, subsequently sealing moves to Segunda División B side Burgos.

Leonel Mosevich, just off a season on loan in Switzerland with FC St. Gallen, was loaned out again on 29 June - to Nacional of Portugal's LigaPro. A number of other players returned from their loan spells on and around 30 June, including Bautista Pavlovsky and Guillermo Benítez. As did the players loaned in. Santiago Silva, a Uruguayan centre-forward from Gimnasia y Esgrima, and Nicolás Silva, an Argentine right winger from Banfield, completed moves in on 1 July. Victorio Ramis, on loan from Godoy Cruz, did likewise soon after. Argentinos drew in an away friendly with Gimnasia y Esgrima on 3 July, before winning game two that day thanks to goals from Raúl Bobadilla and Elías Gómez. Right midfielder Diego Sosa switched Godoy Cruz for Argentinos on 6 July.

Gabriel Hauche and Elías Gómez netted in narrow exhibition match wins over Arsenal de Sarandí on 6 July. Left-back Mauro Maidana headed off to Mitre on 9 July.

July
Colón, also of the Primera División, were Argentinos' first competitive opponents of 2019–20, as they met in the first leg of a Copa Sudamericana knockout tie in Santa Fe on 11 July. Matías Romero subsequently netted the winner, as they earned a one-goal advantage for the second leg. Marcos Angeleri signed from Uruguayan outfit Nacional on 16 July. The second leg with Colón was played on 18 July, with their opponents running out one-nil winners; therefore taking the tie to penalties, which Colón won. Argentinos had an exhibition with Villa Dálmine on 20 July, losing both encounters at the Estadio Diego Armando Maradona. Reserve player Franco Marchetti went on loan to Flandria on 22 July. In their first Primera División match, Argentinos held River Plate to a 1–1 draw.

Argentinos confirmed the exit on loan of goalkeeper Federico Lanzillota on 29 July, as he headed to Chilean football with Palestino for five months. The temporary departures of Luca Falabella (Mitre) and Lucas Ferraz Vila (Fénix) were announced on 30 July.

August
Argentinos travelled to Aldosivi for match two of the 2019–20 league campaign on 3 August, with the fixture ending without goals. Enrique Javier Borja was loaned to Belgrano on 5 August. It was reported, on 14 August, that new signing Santiago Silva had been provisionally suspended after he had failed a drugs test back in April whilst with Gimnasia y Esgrima. Argentinos later revealed Silva was going through fertility treatment with his partner at the time of the test. Argentinos continued their undefeated start in the Primera División with a victory over Banfield on 16 August, with Gabriel Hauche grabbing the decisive goal. Argentinos fought San Martín in the Copa Argentina in Salta on 21 August, with El Bicho progressing on penalties at the Estadio Padre Ernesto Martearena.

Santiago Silva's ban from playing was lifted on 22 August, pending the outcome of the investigation. After no goals away to Aldosivi on matchday two, Argentinos again failed to convert as they drew with Huracán in Parque Patricios on 26 August. A goal from Marcos Angeleri helped Argentinos defeat Almagro in a friendly on 27 August. Academy graduate Matko Miljevic scored the club's winner in a narrow victory over Gimnasia y Esgrima on 31 August.

September
Leandro Paiva was loaned out to Mexico's Atlante on 5 September.

Squad

Transfers
Domestic transfer windows:3 July 2019 to 24 September 201920 January 2020 to 19 February 2020.

Transfers in

Transfers out

Loans in

Loans out

Friendlies

Pre-season
Arsenal de Sarandí, on 11 June 2019, were the first club to be announced as a pre-season opponent for Argentinos Juniors, with the fixtures dated for 6 July. Further games with Huracán was set soon after. Argentinos' full pre-season fixture list was confirmed on 23 June, they added encounters with Estudiantes (BA) and Gimnasia y Esgrima. It was also noted that all matches would be closed to the public.

Mid-season
Villa Dálmine revealed a friendly, scheduled for 20 July, with them on 19 June. They were also set to meet Mitre, though the game was later cancelled. Argentinos would face Almagro on 27 August.

Competitions

Primera División

League table

Relegation table

Source: AFA

Results summary

Matches
The fixtures for the 2019–20 campaign were released on 10 July.

Copa Argentina

San Martín were revealed as Argentinos Juniors' opponents in the round of thirty-two of the Copa Argentina. They beat the Primera B Nacional outfit, which gave them a round of sixteen tie with Lanús.

Copa de la Superliga

Copa Sudamericana

Argentinos Juniors were drawn to face domestic rivals Colón in the Copa Sudamericana round of sixteen, with the home and away ties set for July.

Squad statistics

Appearances and goals

Statistics accurate as of 31 August 2019.

Goalscorers

Notes

References

Argentinos Juniors seasons
Argentinos Juniors